Laudachsee is a lake between the mountains in the Upper Austrian part of the Salzkammergut and neighbour to the larger Traunsee. Beside are the mountains Traunstein and Grünberg.

In the summer the lake reaches about + 20 °C. It drains through Laudach, Alm, Traun into the Danube.

Laudachsee